The Young Communist League USA (YCLUSA) is a communist youth organization in the United States. The stated aim of the League is the development of its members into Communists, through studying Marxism–Leninism and through active participation in the struggles of the American working class. The YCL recognizes the Communist Party USA as the party for socialism in the United States and operates as the Party's youth wing. Although the name of the group changed a number of times during its existence, its origins trace back to 1920, shortly after the establishment of the first communist parties in the United States.

Although independent, in its final years the organization came under direct control of the CPUSA. After a backlash by members towards the suspension of elections and ideological shifts towards the right, membership plummeted. On November 14, 2015, the CPUSA's National Committee voted to suspend funding to the Young Communist League and the organization was subsequently dissolved.

In 2019, in the 39th party convention, the organization was re-established.

History

Early years
The 1920 split of the Socialist Party of America affected its youth section as well, the Young People's Socialist League (YPSL). The YPSL declared itself an independent organization in the fall of 1919, sympathetic to the left wing which had been expelled or left the party. A portion of this "Independent Young People's Socialist League" organization dropped out from activity during this period, while the group's officials, including in the first place Executive Secretary Oliver Carlson, attempted to steer the group to a position of neutrality between the two warring factions of American communism, the Communist Party of America and the Communist Labor Party of America.

The underground period
As early as 1920, a skeleton of a "Young People's Communist League" was in existence. This minuscule, largely paper organization sent a fraternal delegate to the 2nd Convention of the United Communist Party, held at Kingston, New York from December 24, 1920, to January 2, 1921. A report was delivered by this delegate on the youth situation in America and the convention at this time first decided to establish a serious youth section, to be called the Young Communist League. The resolution passed by the convention pledged the UCP would provide its youth section assistance by helping to produce and distribute its literature, by helping to gain control of existing units of the Independent YPSL and organizing them into communist groups, by helping to organize new units, by providing it financial assistance, by lending it speakers and teachers, and by allotting it space in the official party periodicals. The establishment of a parallel "aboveground" to the technically illegal YCL was called for.

Owing to government pressure from the Palmer Raids of the first red scare, the entire communist movement in America had operated a clandestine model of organization, akin to that of the Russian Social Democratic Workers Party prior to the Russian Revolution. The YCL was no different, its leaders and members making use of pseudonyms and holding their meetings in secret.

This did not mean that there was no national convention of the organization. The founding convention of the YCL was held early in May 1922, apparently in Bethel, Connecticut. It was a small and low key gathering, including just fourteen delegates from four of the Communist Party's twelve national districts. The gathering heard a report from Max Bedacht of the adult party dealing with the discussions and decisions of the 3rd World Congress of the Communist International and its February 1922 special conference. The convention adopted a constitution and a program for the YCL, as well as a resolution delineating the relationship of the youth league with the adult party. A governing National Executive Committee of five members was elected. The initiation fee to join the YCL was 50 cents and dues were 25 cents per month, receipted with stamps issued by the National Office. The basic unit of organization was the "group" consisting, ideally, of from five to ten members and meeting at least every other week. Groups elected their own captains to coordinate their activities with the center. Multiple groups were parts of a "section" of up to five groups; multiple sections were part of a "sub-district," which was in turn a subdivision of the regular geographic "districts" of the Communist Party.

The underground form of organization made it very difficult to attract and hold quality recruits – recruiting had to be by word of mouth, literature distribution surreptitious, advertising of meetings non-existent. Accordingly, very little progress was made in building the size and effectiveness of the organization. This underground YCL continued in existence until early 1923, when it was terminated together with the underground adult Communist Party, leaving the "overground" youth and adult groups as the only remaining organizations.

Establishment of the "overground" organization

For the young communist youth, this organization was the Young Workers League of America (YWL), established in 1922. As was the case with the corresponding adult organization, the "legal" YWL had a much easier time establishing itself. By removing from it literature some references to revolution, the YWL was able to meet in the open, to advertise its events, and to distribute its newspapers, leaflets, and pamphlets with only minimal interference from the legal authorities. Consequently, it was able to attract a steady stream of new devotees to the cause – although, as was the case with the adult party, retention of its new recruits always remained problematic.

As a YWL leader, Nat Ganley (then still using his birth name Nat Kaplan) summarized the difference between his communist group and others by stating:  "Let us remember that is it mainly on this point that we differ from the old form of child organization – the worker's Sunday schools.  We are not only preparing the child for future participation in class struggle–we are leading the child in the class struggle now!"

The YWL was also bolstered, as was its adult counterpart, by the addition of a new mass of members coming into the organization from the Finnish Socialist Federation – the largest foreign language federation of the Socialist Party, which had been biding its time as an independent organization since 1921, waiting for an end to the ineffectual underground form of organization. In the middle 1920s, the Workers Party of America was approximately 40% Finnish-American – and its youth section was no exception to this trend.

The founding convention of the YWL was held in Brooklyn, New York from May 13 to 15, 1922, held appropriately enough at Finnish Socialist Hall. Oliver Carlson delivered the keynote speech to the thirty regular and five fraternal delegates. Carlson claimed a presence for the nascent YWL in forty-six cities and a membership of "at the very least," 2,200. The convention approved a manifesto, program, constitution, and various resolutions. Membership in the organization was said to be open to "all proletarians" between the ages of fourteen and thirty.

The basic unit of organization of the YWL was the "branch," consisting of at least five but no more than one hundred and fifty members. Two or more branches in a single large city were to form a "City Central Committee" to coordinate their activities, and all units were to be part of the regular array of districts used by the adult party. The initiation fee was 25 cents and dues 25 cents per month, with all initiation fees and 10 cents of every month's dues going to support the National Office.

The organization was governed by a National Executive Committee of seven members, of whom at least five were to live in a single locale. Chicago was set as the headquarters city for the organization, a change from the group's provisional base of operations in New York. Martin Abern was elected as National Secretary of the organization, Oliver Carlson was named as editor, and the pair were joined on the NEC by business manager Harry Gannes, treasurer Gus Schulenburg, and future fixture of the 1930s American radical movement Herbert Zam.

The name of the youth league ultimately followed the name of the adult party, becoming the Young Workers (Communist) League in 1926 when the Workers Party became the "Workers (Communist) Party" and to the Young Communist League, USA in 1929 when the adult party became the "Communist Party, USA."

The depression decade and after
The turn toward the Popular Front initiated a period of the YCL's greatest growth and it may have had as many as 12,000 members in New York City alone by 1939.

On October 17, 1943, the YCL convened in national convention in New York City, passed a resolution dissolving itself, and immediately reconvened under a new organizational name, the American Youth for Democracy (AYD). This predated a similar move transforming the adult Communist Party, USA into the "Communist Political Association" by seven months. The change of names proved to be strictly semantic, as all important positions within the "new" AYD were held by former members of the YCL. National Executive Secretary of the AYD at the time of its October 1943 launch was Carl Ross, the former head of the YCL for a period of more than five years.

It followed the CPUSA into dissolution, reconstituting itself as American Youth for Democracy (AYD). It retained that name even after the CPUSA reformed in 1946, until contributing toward the youth organization of the Progressive Party, the Young Progressives of America.

The CPUSA reestablished a youth organization in 1949 as the Labor Youth League, which dissolved in the dissension following the Hungarian Revolution of 1956 and the 20th Congress of the CPSU.  In 1965, after a period of mainly local activity, the DuBois Clubs were formed and later renamed the Young Workers Liberation League before reaffirming the original name Young Communist League in 1984.

The dissolution of the YCL
After the restoration of capitalism in the Warsaw Pact countries, the YCL and the Party experienced a decrease in membership. However, after the contested election of George W. Bush as president of the United States and the escalation of militarism, membership began to rise again. The YCL experienced a rapid growth in membership after the 2008 elections, largely due to the prominent role played by youth in the election of Barack Obama and the fact that his opponents criticized his pro-labor rhetoric as "socialist." Membership continued to grow during Obama's presidency, as increasing numbers of young, left-wing Americans became dissatisfied with that administration's policy decisions.

YCL members argued that the organization operated in cities and rural areas across the country. It organizes national schools and conferences based in Chicago, Illinois. According to its constitution, "The YCL is devoted to the interests of all young people and is dedicated to the revolutionary cause of the working class of our country, the transformation of the United States through mass democratic struggle into a socialist society."

In the years immediately preceding its dissolution, YCL members argued in the CPUSA and YCL press that the group had experienced a rapid rate of expansion and had thus opened chapters all over the country. This rapid influx of membership increasingly led towards a more radical and militant base which led to conflict with the CPUSA, which had a more liberal, pro-Democratic Party stance. In response, the CPUSA absorbed and dissolved the YCL, prompting many clubs to leave and become independent or realign with other communist groups, such as the Red Guards.

Re-establishment 
In 2019, a resolution at the 31st National Convention of the CPUSA was passed which called to re-establish the Young Communist League. In 2020, the YCL was officially re-established by the CPUSA.

See also 
 W.E.B. DuBois Clubs of America
 Young Democratic Socialists
 Worker Rights Consortium
 United Students Against Sweatshops
 Student/Farmworker Alliance
 Students for a Democratic Society

Footnotes

External links 

 Young Worker, Marxists Internet Archive. —PDFs of full issues, 1922–1927.
 "Young Communist League (1921–1939)," Early American Marxism website. —Historical documents of the YCL.

Youth wings of communist parties
Youth wings of political parties in the United States
Communist Party USA mass organizations
Political youth organizations in the United States